Joe Picker (born 7 December 1987) is an Australian former professional rugby league footballer from Crookwell, New South Wales. He previously played for the Canberra Raiders and South Sydney Rabbitohs in the National Rugby League. Picker has represented the Prime Minister's XIII and Australian Schoolboys. Picker was a part of the South Sydney squad that won the 2014 NRL Premiership but did not play in any finals matches or the grand final itself.

Professional playing career

Canberra Raiders
After a break-out season in 2008 picker was named on the bench in the Prime Minister's XIII and scored a try.  Picker went on to play 110 times for the Canberra Raiders in the NRL.

South Sydney Rabbitohs
On 18 November 2013, Picker signed with the South Sydney Rabbitohs for the 2014 NRL season.  Picker played his first match for South Sydney in the 2014 Charity Shield, scoring a try.

Personal life
His younger brothers Michael Picker and Ben Picker both play for Canberra.

References

1987 births
Australian rugby league players
Canberra Raiders players
Mount Pritchard Mounties players
Prime Minister's XIII players
South Sydney Rabbitohs players
Rugby league second-rows
Rugby league locks
Living people
Rugby league players from New South Wales